Nag's Head Island is an island in the River Thames in England at Abingdon. It sits in the middle of the two Abingdon Bridges on the reach above Culham Lock.

The part of the island on the upstream side of the bridge is occupied by the Nag's Head public house, which gave the island its name, a nag being a useless horse.

From the top of the island here a daily river boat service to runs to Oxford. 

The frontage downstream of the bridge is occupied by a riverside cafe, chandlers and navigation stores, and boat hire facilities. Behind this is an extensive public open space.

See also
Islands in the River Thames

References

Islands of Oxfordshire
Islands of the River Thames